Sherfield English is a small village and civil parish in the Test Valley borough of Hampshire, England. It is located on the A27 road, around 4 miles (6.4 km) west of Romsey.

Sherfield English appears in Domesday Book of 1086 as the manor of Sirefelle, derived from the Anglo-Saxon scir feld, which probably means "bright open land". The suffix "English" probably comes from the L'Engleys family, who held the manor in the 14th century.

The parish church is dedicated to St Leonard. It was built in 1902 with funds given by Lady Ashburton, and is Grade II listed. The village also contains a village hall and a pub, The Hatchet Inn.

Notable people
Charles Barton  (1860–1919), first-class cricketer

References

Villages in Hampshire
Test Valley